The Six des Eaux Froides is a mountain of the Bernese Alps, located north of Anzère in the canton of Valais. It lies in the massif of the Wildhorn, between the Lac des Audannes and the Lac de Tseuzier.

References

External links
 Six des Eaux Froides on Hikr

Mountains of the Alps
Mountains of Switzerland
Mountains of Valais
Two-thousanders of Switzerland